The 032 Separate Commandant's Battalion named after Colonel General Jamsrangijn Jondon, known simply as the 032 Military Unit is a military unit of the Armed Forces of Mongolia. The unit takes part in the peacetime protection of the capital, with its main task being of law enforcement and to continuously organize daily activities, military supplies and services.

It was formed in 1924 after the Mongolian People's Republic was established three years earlier.  It was named the Ulaanbaatar City Commandant. The unit in its current form was established on 16 August 1955 in accordance with directive No. 057 of Lieutenant General Sanjiin Bataa from the Mongolian People's Army. The composition of the battalion includes the following units: Mongolian State Honor Guard, Military Police Company and Special Forces Company. The honor guard company is involved in both the welcoming and seeing off of foreign state during their official visits to Mongolia, which is among a large number of other diverse events. The military police and special forces companies are entrusted with the task of protecting strategic facilities and ensuring public safety in the capital. In 2013, it was the winner of an inter-military contest called "Mongolia Military Glory". On its golden jubilee in 1974, it was awarded the Order of Merit by the People's Great Khural. On 2 October 2019, Mongolian President Khaltmaagiin Battulga issued a decree awarding the unit with the Order of the Red Banner of Merit. The presentation of the award was conducted by Chief of the Presidential Office, who then gave a welcoming speech on behalf of Battulga. In 2020, T. Ganbold, a senior lieutenant in the unit, served as the flag bearer for the Mongolian contingent during the 2020 Moscow Victory Day Parade on Red Square.

See also
154th Preobrazhensky Independent Commandant's Regiment
Kremlin Regiment
Independent Presidential Regiment (Ukraine)
Pyongyang Defense Command

References

Military units and formations of Mongolia
1924 establishments in Mongolia
Military units and formations established in 1924